Canadice may refer to:
 Canadice (grape)
 Canadice, New York
 Canadice Lake